Reginald John Lane (January 4, 1920 – October 2, 2003) was a Royal Canadian Air Force officer. He served as deputy commander of NORAD from 1972 to 1974.

References

1920 births
2003 deaths
People from Victoria, British Columbia
Canadian Forces Air Command generals